Carl Frühling (28 November 186825 November 1937) was an Austrian composer and pianist.

Born in Lemberg (now Lviv, Ukraine), he attended from 1887 until 1889 the Gesellschaft der Musikfreunde where he was taught the piano by Anton Door and music theory by Franz Krenn. He became a piano accompanist and teacher, working with Bronisław Huberman, Pablo de Sarasate, Egon Wellesz, and the Rosé Quartet. He died in Vienna in poverty.

His early piano works are salon pieces, while his Piano Quintet, Op. 30, and Clarinet Trio, Op. 40, are more substantial, written in the Romantic tradition. In 2009, his Piano Quintet was reprinted by Edition Silvertrust. Much of his music is lost or has yet to be uncovered. Steven Isserlis, the cellist, has championed his music, some of which he has rediscovered and performed.

Compositions

Orchestral
Piano Concerto, Op. 12
Festmarsch, Op. 23
Scènes de ballet, Op. 34
Suite in F major, Op. 36
Heitere Ouvertüre, Op. 75
Miniaturen, suite, Op. 78
Humoreske, Op. 87

Chamber
Sonata, Op. 22, for cello and piano
String Quartet in E major, Op. 25
Piano Quintet in F minor, Op. 30
Piano Trio in E major, Op. 32
Piano Quartet in D major, Op. 35
Trio in A minor, Op. 40, for clarinet, cello and piano (published 1925 by )
Fantasie, Op. 55, for flute and piano
Duettino, Op. 57, for 2 flutes
Rondo, Op. 66, for flute and piano

Piano
Lucie, mazurka, Op. 1
La piquante, polka française, Op. 5
Mazurka brillante, Op. 11
Serenade, Op. 13
Pas des sylphides, waltz, Op. 14
5 pièces, Opp. 15–19
3 Klavierstücke, Op. 21
Konzertwalzer, Op. 24
2 Klavierstücke, Op. 37

Choral
Große Messe in G major, Op. 6
Cantata (A. Silesius), Op. 54, for solo voices, mixed chorus and organ
3 Sinnsprüche (Assim Agha), Op. 62, for mixed chorus
Lied der Eintagsfliegen (C. Schneller), Op. 63, for female chorus and piano (4 hands)
Am Strome, Op. 67, for male chorus
2 Lieder im Volkston, Op. 68, for mixed chorus
Brudergruss, Op. 73, for male chorus
Matt gießt der Mond, Op. 74, for mixed chorus
Opp. 77, 89, 91, 93, 102, for mixed chorus
Opp. 80, 83, 86, 106, for male chorus

Solo vocal
Der Landsturm (M. Marton), Op. 39, for voice and orchestra
3 Gesänge nach altjapansichen Gedichten, Op. 47, for voice and orchestra
Gesang Buddhas, Op. 59, for baritone and wind orchestra
2 Gesänge, Op. 70, for tenor and orchestra
5 Lieder, for voice and orchestra
Lieder for voice and piano

References

Further reading

External links

 Sound-bites from the Op. 30 Piano Quintet, Edition Silvertrust
 "The Invisible Composer"by Steven Isserlis, The Guardian, 6 October 2000 

Austrian Romantic composers
Austrian classical pianists
Male classical pianists
1868 births
1937 deaths
Austrian male classical composers
20th-century male musicians
19th-century male musicians